Robert Chandler (fl. 1380s) was an English politician.

He was a Member (MP) of the Parliament of England for Chippenham in May 1382 and 1386. Nothing else is recorded of him.

References

14th-century births
Year of death missing
English MPs May 1382
English MPs 1386
14th-century English politicians